XHPTOM-FM is a radio station on 100.3 FM in Puerto Morelos, Quintana Roo, with studios in Cancún. It is owned by Carlos de Jesús Aguirre Gómez and carries the Ke Buena grupera format from Televisa Radio.

History
XHPTOM was awarded in the IFT-4 radio auction of 2017 on a rebound after the initial winning bidder, La Mera en Playa, failed to pay the winning 42 million peso bid for this frequency. The winning bid by a consortium of Carlos de Jesús Aguirre Gómez and CJAguirre Nacional, S.A.P.I. de C.V., was 11.5 million pesos.

References

External links

Radio stations in Quintana Roo
Radio stations established in 2019
2019 establishments in Mexico